South Dakota Highway 49 (SD 49) is a  long state route that runs north to south in south-central South Dakota.  It begins at a junction with South Dakota Highway 47 just south of the White River, and terminates at the junction of U.S. Highway 18 and U.S. Highway 183 in Colome.

History
The road currently known as South Dakota 49 first received a number in the late 1960s, when South Dakota Highway 147 was established as a branch off South Dakota 47.  This branch extended from the junction near the White River to Hamill.  In 1976, the route was designated as South Dakota 49, with the number extended to the junction with South Dakota Highway 44.  In 1984, the route was further extended to Colome, at the junction of U.S. 18 and U.S. 183.

Major intersections

References

External links

South Dakota Highways Page: Highways 31-60

049
Transportation in Tripp County, South Dakota
Transportation in Lyman County, South Dakota